The name Francisco has been used to name four tropical cyclones in the northwestern Pacific Ocean. The name was contributed by the United States of America, and is a male given name in the Chamorro language.

 Typhoon Francisco (2001) (T0118, 22W) – a strong typhoon that never impacted land.
 Tropical Storm Francisco (2007) (T0713, 15W) – a minimal tropical storm that struck southern China.
 Typhoon Francisco (2013) (T1327, 26W, Urduja) – is the 4th super typhoon of the season, which steered well away from Japan.
 Typhoon Francisco (2019) (T1908, 09W) — a minimal typhoon that made landfall over Japan and Korea.

The name Francisco has also been used for one tropical cyclone in the Southwestern Indian Ocean.
 Tropical Storm Francisco (2020) - a minimal tropical storm which affected Madagascar.

Pacific typhoon set index articles